Girgarre Football Club was established in 1920 as a junior team and first made a senior team in 1932 in the Kyabram District Football Association. Girgarre is a small town in North Eastern Victoria. The club is known as "the Kangaroos".

Premierships:
1952 (Kyabram District Football Association)
1976 (Kyabram & District Football League)
1983 (Kyabram District Football League)
1991 (Kyabram District Football League)

KDFL Best & Fairest Winners:
1946 - K. Dunstall
1950 - J. Brown
1954 - L. Doolan
1959 - G. Arthur
1963 - R. Doolan
1966 - A. Carson
1969 - M. Varcoe (tied)
1971 - N. Langley
1978 - L. Casey
1982 - G. Wallis

KDFL Leading Goal Kickers:
1976 A.Jones 87

External links
Official Kyabram and District Football League Website

Kyabram & District Football League clubs
1920 establishments in Australia
Australian rules football clubs established in 1920